Wang may refer to:

Names 
 Wang (surname) (王), a common Chinese surname
 Wāng (汪), a less common Chinese surname
 Titles in Chinese nobility
 A title in Korean nobility
 A title in Mongolian nobility

Places 
 Wang River in Thailand
 Wang Township, Minnesota, a township in the United States
 Wang, Bavaria, a town in the district of Freising, Bavaria, Germany
 Wang, Austria, a town in the district of Scheibbs in Lower Austria
 An abbreviation for the town of Wangaratta, Australia
 Wang Theatre, in Boston, Massacheussetts
 Charles B. Wang Center, an Asian American center at Stony Brook University

Other 
 Wang (Tibetan Buddhism), a form of empowerment or initiation
 Wang tile, in mathematics, are a class of formal systems
 Wang (musical), an 1891 New York musical
 Wang Film Productions, Taiwanese-American animation studios
 Wang Laboratories, an American computer company founded by Dr. An Wang
 WWNG, a radio station (1330 AM) licensed to serve Havelock, North Carolina, United States, which held the call sign WANG from 1999 to 2017
 WHAR, a radio station licensed to Havelock, North Carolina formerly known as WANG-FM
 WANG, a radio station using the call sign since 2018
 Wang International Standard Code for Information Interchange, a proprietary version of ASCII

See also 
 
 Huang (disambiguation)
 Wong (disambiguation)
 Wang Chung (disambiguation)
 Vong (disambiguation)
 Whang (disambiguation)
 Waang (disambiguation)